Serafino Vannutelli (26 November 1834 – 19 August 1915) was an Italian prelate of the Catholic Church, a cardinal and official of the Roman Curia where he held several of the highest administrative posts. Made a cardinal in 1887, he was named a cardinal-bishop in 1893 and elected dean of the College of Cardinals in 1915 and he died shortly after. He was thought a possible candidate for the papacy in 1903.

At the start of his career, he worked in the diplomatic service of the Holy See from 1869 to 1887, serving as Apostolic Delegate to several Latin American countries and as Apostolic Nuncio to Belgium and Austria.

His younger brother Vincenzo (1836–1930) was also a Catholic cardinal.

Biography
Vannutelli was born at Genazzano, in the diocese of Palestrina,  where he studied and graduated in philosophy before studying theology in the Capranica College, Rome. After teaching theology at the Pontifical Seminary, he began his work in the diplomatic service of the Holy See as secretary to the Papal Nuncio in Bavaria. He became auditor to the Nuncio at the Court of Maximilian in Mexico.

On 25 June 1869 he was appointed Titular Archbishop of Nicaea and on 18 July was consecrated a bishop by Cardinal Costantino Patrizi Naro. On 23 July 1869, he was named Apostolic Delegate to Ecuador, Peru, Colombia, and Central America, which comprised these countries: El Salvador, Guatemala, Costa Rica, Honduras, and Nicaragua. He was made Apostolic Nuncio to Brussels in 1875, but his role there ended abruptly when the Belgian government broke off diplomatic relations with the Holy See on 28 June 1880. He became Apostolic Nuncio to Austria on 18 November of that year.

His service as a nuncio ended when Pope Leo XIII made him a cardinal on 14 March 1887. As a Cardinal-Priest he was initially assigned the title of Santa Sabina, and then assigned to San Girolamo dei Croati on 11 February 1889.

On 16 January 1893, after Vannutelli reportedly declined an appointment as Secretary of State, Pope Leo XIII named him Archbishop of Bologna, an assignment considered an exile from Rome. The Pope wrote a letter to the people of Bologna saying that he had been guided by divine inspiration in making the appointment and was reported to have said "Vannutelli goes to Bologna Cardinal and will return a Pope". The New York Times commented: "He has for some time been prominently mentioned in connection with the Papal succession, and is supported by an influential ecclesiastical party, with whom, it is believed, Pope Leo is in sympathy." He served until he was named Cardinal-Bishop of Frascati just six months later on 12 June 1893.

From 1899 until his death in 1915 he was Major Penitentiary of Apostolic Penitentiary.

He served as Secretary of the Congregation for Universal Inquisition (later known as the Congregation for the Doctrine of the Faith), from 16 January 1903 until he resigned that office on 31 December 1908 at the age of 74. On 22 June 1903 he was moved from Frascati to become Cardinal-Bishop of Porto Santa e Rufina. At the conclave in 1903 that elected Pope Pius X, he was considered a contender for election to the papacy.

On 25 May 1914, Pope Pius X approved his election as Dean of the College of Cardinals, adding the title of Cardinal-Bishop of Ostia to his other titles. Performing the duties of Dean during the conclave that met in August 1914 proved challenging as he was "almost blind ... stone deaf ... and weakened from nervous prostration". En route to that conclave from Naples, his train was bombed and several other passengers were injured.

He died in Rome on 19 August 1915.

References

External links
 Serafino Vanuttelli, Catholic Hierarchy 

1834 births
1915 deaths
People from Genazzano
Deans of the College of Cardinals
Apostolic Nuncios to Ecuador
Apostolic Nuncios to Colombia
Cardinals created by Pope Leo XIII
Apostolic Nuncios to Austria
Cardinal-bishops of Frascati
Cardinal-bishops of Ostia
Cardinal-bishops of Porto
Roman Catholic archbishops of Bologna
20th-century Italian cardinals
19th-century Italian Roman Catholic archbishops
Members of the Holy Office
Major Penitentiaries of the Apostolic Penitentiary
Apostolic Delegates to Peru
Apostolic Nuncios to Belgium
Apostolic Nuncios to Costa Rica